The Warren Sutton House, in Clay County, Georgia in the vicinity of Edison, Georgia, was built in 1912.  It was listed on the National Register of Historic Places in 1994.  It has also been known as the James Lowell Ingram Property.

It is a one-and-a-half-story, wood-framed, Classical Revival with a modified central hall plan. It was built in 1912 by Warren M. Sutton on a  farm.  Warren Sutton was successful as a cotton farmer, "assisted by 50 families farming as sharecroppers."

References

Houses on the National Register of Historic Places in Georgia (U.S. state)
Neoclassical architecture in Georgia (U.S. state)
National Register of Historic Places in Clay County, Georgia